John Keith Avery,  (7 August 1927 – 19 May 2018) was the Commissioner of the New South Wales Police from 1984 to 1991.

Commissioner of New South Wales Police
John Keith Avery was the 17th leader of the organisation and the 10th person known under the title of Commissioner of Police. Avery was one of the longest serving and more popular Commissioners of Police to serve the state of New South Wales.

One of the first Police Commissioners to have a tertiary education, Avery held a master's degree from Macquarie University and a Diploma in Criminology. He was awarded the Officer of the Order of Australia, Australian Police Medal, Centenary Medal and National Medal.

Avery retired with his wife to Port Macquarie on the mid-north coast of New South Wales.

Legacy
The library at the New South Wales Police College at Goulburn is named in his honour. The former headquarters of the New South Wales Police in College Street, Sydney was also named in his honour, named the Avery Building until the headquarters moved to a new building in Parramatta in 2003.

References

1927 births
2018 deaths
Commissioners of the New South Wales Police
Officers of the Order of Australia
People from New South Wales
Recipients of the Centenary Medal
Recipients of the Australian Police Medal